During the 2019–20 season, ADO Den Haag participated in the Eredivisie and the KNVB Cup. Due to the COVID-19 pandemic, the Eredivisie season was abandoned with ADO Den Haag in 17th place. They were knocked out in the first round of the KNVB Cup, losing in the first round at Fortuna Sittard.

Season summary
After a poor start to the season, manager Alfons Groenendijk resigned on 2 December 2019, with Den Haag second bottom in the Eredivisie. On 24 December 2019, Den Haag appointed English manager Alan Pardew as their new manager signing a contract until the end of the season, with Chris Powell appointed as assistant manager. Pardew took charge of eight league games, winning one, before play was halted in the Netherlands on 12 March due to the coronavirus pandemic. Den Haag were seven points from safety in the 2019–20 Eredivisie before the season was cancelled with no relegation. On 28 April 2020, Pardew left the club after both parties mutually agreed to not extend his contract beyond the end of the season.

Friendly matches

Competitions

Overview

Eredivisie

League table

Results summary

Results by round

Matches
The Eredivisie schedule was announced on 14 June 2019. The 2019–20 season was abandoned on 24 April 2020, due to the coronavirus pandemic in the Netherlands.

KNVB Cup

Transfers

Transfers in

Transfers out

Loans in

Loans out

Notes

References

ADO Den Haag seasons
Dutch football clubs 2019–20 season